Gedgrave is a civil parish in the East Suffolk district, in the English county of Suffolk in eastern England. In 2005 its population was 30. Gedgrave once had a church called St Andrews. The village is part of a joint parish council with Orford.

Gedgrave gives its name to the Gedgravian Stage of the Pliocene Epoch in British geological stratigraphy. The Sites of Special Scientific Interest Gedgrave Hall Pit and Richmond Farm Pit are situated close by.

References

External links
Orford and Gedgrave Parish Council

Civil parishes in Suffolk
Suffolk Coastal